Chryssolakkos means the "Pit of gold". This is where the ancient necropolis (royal burial enclosure or cemetery, 1700BCE) in Malia, an ancient Minoan town in Crete, Greece is located.  As well as the famous Malia Pendant, it is commonly thought that the so-called Aegina Treasure of Minoan jewellery in the British Museum was excavated here by local people in the 19th century. 

The Malia Pendant, on display at the Heraklion Archaeological Museum , was found here and is of high quality goldsmithery of the Minoan times. The jewel takes the form of two insects, which are identical (mirror images) joined head-to-head with the tips of their abdomens almost touching in a symmetrical or heraldic arrangement. The insects’ wings spread backwards. From the lower edges of the wings and a point close to the tip of the abdomen dangle three discs. With their legs, the insects are "grasping" a centrally placed circular disc and there is a second, smaller, smooth globule placed above this and between the insects' heads as if they were eating it. Megascolia maculata, a wasp, was proposed as the model for the insects, and the fruits of a native Cretan herb Tordylium apulum as a model for the three discs that are suspended from the pendant, though most scholars are happy to regard the as bees, perhaps over a honeycomb.

References

Castleden, Rodney, Minoans: Life in Bronze Age Crete, 2002, Taylor & Francis, google books
Hood, Sinclair, The Arts in Prehistoric Greece, 1978, Penguin (Penguin/Yale History of Art), 

Minoan sites in Crete